Albert Edward Bernard Wiegman (born March 1952) is a British private equity manager, founder and partner of Langholm Capital.

Early life
Wiegman was educated at Carshalton College of Further Education, and the Manchester University.

Langholm Capital
Under Wiegman, Langholm Capital's successful investments have included Just Retirement, Bart Spices, Dorset Cereals, Lumene, and Tyrrells.

Wiegman is the Renter Warden of the Worshipful Company of Wheelwrights.

Personal life
Wiegman is married to Gail, and lives in London.

References

1952 births
British financial businesspeople
British chief executives
Living people
Place of birth missing (living people)
Alumni of the University of Manchester
Businesspeople from London
British Eurosceptics